BGCC may refer to:

 Barnt Green Cricket Club
 Baptist General Conference of Canada
 Boys & Girls Clubs of Canada